Lou Ann Walker is an author and a professor in the MFA in Creative Writing and Literature Program at Stony Brook Southampton, as well as a founding Editor of The Southampton Review. Her memoir A Loss for Words received a Christopher Award for high standards in Communication.

Her fiction and nonfiction has appeared in many publications, including The New York Times Magazine, Esquire, Life, Allure, Parade, The Chicago Sun-Times, The New York Times Book Review, O: The Oprah Magazine, The Writer, and The Hopewell Review. Formerly an editor at Esquire and New York Magazine, Walker has lectured on writing at Smith College and Yale University, and taught at Marymount Manhattan College, Southampton College, and Columbia University.

Her awards include a Marguerite Higgins reporting award and an NEA grant in Creative Writing. The author of several screenplays, she is also a member of the Writers Guild of America.

Publications 
Hand, Heart, and Mind: The Story of the Education of America's Deaf People (1994)
Roy Lichtenstein: The Artist at Work (1994)
A Loss for Words: The Story of Deafness in a Family (1987)
Amy: The Story of a Deaf Child (1985)

Social media 
louannwalker.com

References 

20th-century American novelists
American women novelists
American magazine editors
Screenwriters from New York (state)
Stony Brook University faculty
Living people
20th-century American women writers
Novelists from New York (state)
American women non-fiction writers
20th-century American non-fiction writers
Women magazine editors
Year of birth missing (living people)
American women academics
21st-century American women